"Everything Changes" is a song by English boy band Take That. Released as the fifth single from the band's second studio album, Everything Changes (1993), and written by Gary Barlow and producers Michael Ward, Eliot Kennedy and Cary Bayliss, the song features Robbie Williams on lead vocals.

The single was released on 28 March 1994, becoming Take That's fourth consecutive single to go straight in at number one on the UK Singles Chart, where it remained for two weeks. The song sold 200,000 copies in the UK and has received a silver disc certification from the British Phonographic Industry.

Critical reception
Tom Ewing of Freaky Trigger described "Everything Changes" as "breezy" and "disco-inspired", noting that "this is the first number one with lead vocals from Robbie Williams." In his weekly UK chart commentary, James Masterton declared it as "a pop-tinged slice of 70s disco soul". Pan-European magazine Music & Media commented, "Philly soul is what the "fab five" exercise on the title track off their current album." Alan Jones from Music Week gave it five out of five, writing, "The glossy but insubstantial title track of the boys' double platinum album has a good chance of becoming their fourth consecutive number one". In an retrospective review, Pop Rescue remarked that Williams opens the song "with some sultry reassurance before it opens out into a bouncy little pop song", adding that "at times, this song feels somewhat Stock/Aitken/Waterman". Mark Sutherland from Smash Hits also gave it four out of five, writing, "If truth be told, the fifth single from the album isn't the 'That at their best. Sung by Rob, it trips along merrily enough and is the proud owner of an extremely perky chorus, but it isn't a patch on "Pray" or "Babe"."

Music video
The accompanying music video for the song, liberally based on Kylie Minogue's video for her single "Give Me Just a Little More Time" (shot in the same location, two years earlier, in sepia tone), shows the band in a jazz cafe performing the song with people in the cafe joining in. The video uses the 7-inch mix, which removes Williams' spoken intro from the album version that says "Girl, come over here, let me hold you for a little while and remember I'll always love you." The 7-inch mix also appears on their Greatest Hits album. "Everything Changes" received heavy rotation on MTV Europe and was A-listed on Germany's VIVA.

Track listings
The B-side of the single features a studio version of a medley of songs by the Beatles, which the band performed live in concerts. The songs included, in order, are "I Want to Hold Your Hand", "A Hard Day's Night" and "She Loves You".

 UK and European 7-inch and cassette single 
 "Everything Changes"
 "Beatles Medley"

 UK CD single 
 "Everything Changes"
 "Beatles Medley"
 "Everything Changes" (Nigel Lowis remix)
 "Everything Changes" (extended version)

 UK CD digipak single 
 "Everything Changes" (Nigel Lowis remix)
 "Interview"
 "Relight My Fire" (live at Wembley Arena)

 German CD single 
 "Everything Changes" – 3:35
 "You Are the One" – 8:07
 "Beatles Medley" – 3:39 
 "Interview" – 4:26

 European CD single 
 "Everything Changes" – 3:33
 "Relight My Fire" (live at Wembley Arena) – 8:07

 Australasian CD single 
 "Everything Changes"
 "Beatles Medley"
 "Everything Changes" (Nigel Lowis remix)
 "Everything Changes" (extended version)
 "Interview"

 Japanese CD single 
 "Everything Changes"
 "Beatles Medley"
 "Everything Changes" (Nigel Lowis remix)
 "Everything Changes" (extended version)
 "Interview"
 "Relight My Fire" (live at Wembley Arena)

Personnel
 Robbie Williams – lead vocals
 Gary Barlow – backing vocals
 Howard Donald – backing vocals
 Jason Orange – backing vocals
 Mark Owen – backing vocals

Charts and certifications

Weekly charts

Year-end charts

Decade-end charts

Certifications

Usage in media
In the Derry Girls episode "The Concert", the girls attend a Take That concert. Footage from a real gig was used, in which the band sang "Everything Changes".

See also
 List of UK Singles Chart number ones of the 1990s

References

1993 songs
1994 singles
Bertelsmann Music Group singles
Number-one singles in Scotland
RCA Records singles
Songs written by Eliot Kennedy
Songs written by Gary Barlow
Songs written by Michael Ward (musician)
Take That songs
UK Singles Chart number-one singles